Live in L.A. may refer to:
 Live in L.A. (Death & Raw), 2001 album from American metal band Death
 Live in L.A. (Joe Cocker album), 1976 album from English blues and rock musician Joe Cocker
 Live in LA (Trevor Rabin album), 2003 album from South African musician Trevor Rabin
 Live in L.A. (The Rippingtons album), 1992 album from American contemporary jazz group The Rippingtons

See also
 L.A. Live